Árpád Prandler (23 February 1930 – 5 February 2014) was a Hungarian jurist who served as an Ad Litem Judge of the International Criminal Tribunal for the former Yugoslavia based in The Hague, Netherlands between 2006 and 2013.

Professional experience

1962–2014 Various positions at the Hungarian Ministry of Foreign Affairs. 
1963–1968 Deputy Representative, Permanent Mission of Hungary to the United Nations 
1963–1970 Member of the Hungarian delegation to United Nations General Assembly 
1968–1974 Secretary General, Hungarian Lawyers Association. 
1974–1983 Director, International Law Department. 
1974–1982 Head of Hungarian delegation to the Third United Nations Conference on Law of the Sea. 
1975–1982 Member of the Hungarian delegation to the General Assembly of the United Nations. 
1976–2014 Ambassador. 
1981–2014 Member of the Permanent Court of Arbitration in The Hague. 
1983–1990 Director and Deputy to the Under-Secretary-General for Disarmament Affairs at the United Nations. 
1990 Secretary-General of the Fourth Review Conference of the Parties to the Treaty on the Non-Proliferation of Nuclear Weapons. 
1993–2014 Alternate Representative of Hungary to the Danube Commission. 
1994–2004 Member of the Hungarian delegation to United Nations General Assembly. 
1996–2014 Member of the International Humanitarian Fact-Finding Commission. 
1992–1997 Senior Adviser at the Ministry of Foreign Affairs.
1997–2000 Deputy Director of the International Law Department of the Ministry of Foreign Affairs. 
1998–2002 Member of Hungarian delegations to preparatory work on the Statute of the International Criminal Court. 
1999–2002 Head of Hungarian delegation to the Preparatory Commission for the International Criminal Court. 
2001–2002 Director of the International Law Department of the Ministry of Foreign Affairs. 
2002–2003 Chairman of the Sixth (Legal) Committee of the United Nations General Assembly. 
2003–2014 Senior Adviser at the Ministry of Foreign Affairs. 
2003–2014 Chairman of the Preparatory Committee for revising the Belgrade Convention of 1948 regarding the regime of navigation of the Danube. 
2006–2013 Ad litem judge, International Criminal Tribunal for the former Yugoslavia.
In addition, served as Chairman of the National Advisory Committee on International Humanitarian Law since 1999 and, since 2000, as Chairman of the Hungarian branch of International Law Association.

Education
1952 Eötvös Loránd University, Budapest, Faculty of Law – Doctor Juris, Bachelor of Law. 
1957 Eötvös Loránd University, Budapest, Faculty of History – Bachelor of History 
1972 Hungarian Academy of Sciences - Candidate of Legal Sciences (International Law, Ph.D). 
1952–2006 Budapest University, Faculty of Law - Senior Lecturer, History of Law - Professor of International Law. 
1992–2006 Budapest University of Economics, later on Corvinus University - Department of International Relations - Honorary Professor.

Note verbale

The Embassy of Hungary presents its compliments to the Secretariat of the Assembly of States 
Parties of the International Criminal Court and has the honour to inform it of the following. 
 
The Government of Hungary attaches great importance to the work of the International 
Criminal Court and regarding the qualities of its judges as being of the utmost significance to the 
effectiveness of the Court, therefore, as part of the Eastern European Group, Hungary hereby would 
like to submit the nomination of Judge Árpád Prandler Ph.D to the Advisory Committee on 
nominations of judges of the International Criminal Court. 
 
Judge Prandler has been active both in the field of public international law and international 
criminal law. He acquired his doctorate in the field of international law and, since 1952, he has 
gathered relevant experience as professor at the most prestigious Hungarian universities. 
 
Judge Prandler has moreover, established competence and experience in international criminal 
law and has an extensive knowledge of issues concerning the International Criminal Court (ICC), 
since in 1998 he was a member of the Hungarian delegation to the preparatory work of the Rome 
Statute of the International Criminal Court, later Head of the Hungarian delegation to the Preparatory 
Commission for the ICC. As an ad litem judge of the International Criminal Tribunal for the former 
Yugoslavia, since 2006, he has proved to be a person of high moral character, which is further 
enriched by his widespread professional experience. 
 
In addition, he has outstanding practical experience in the field of international law and the 
United Nations system in particular, obtained in the governmental sector, as on numerous occasions he 
filled the position of the Director of the International Law Department of the Ministry of Foreign 
Affairs of Hungary, served at the Permanent Mission of Hungary to the United Nations and was a 
member of the Hungarian delegation to the United Nations General Assembly. Between 2002 and 
2003, Judge Prandler also filled the position of the Chairman of the Sixth Committee of the United 
Nations General Assembly.

Publications
Author of several articles on, among other things, the Charter of the United Nations, 
peacekeeping, Law of the Sea, disarmament, human rights, international humanitarian law, 
international criminal law, human rights law, and international organizations. Also published 
a University textbook on international organizations and institutions (its third edition was 
published in 2011) and written a monograph on the United Nations Security Council.

Az ENSZ Biztonsági Tanácsa. Budapest: Közgazdasági és Jogi. 1974.
Nemzetközi szervezetek és intézmények. ed. Prandler, Árpád. Budapest: Aula. 2001.  (co-author)
Nemzetközi szervezetek és intézmények. ed. Prandler, Árpád. Second edition. Budapest: Aula. 2005.  (co-author)

References

Sources
MTI Ki Kicsoda 2006, Magyar Távirati Iroda, Budapest, 2005, p. 1390.
Prandler Árpád életrajta a Nemzetközi Törvényszék honlapján
Az Index cikke Prandler hágai bíróvá történt megválasztásáról

1930 births
2014 deaths
International Criminal Tribunal for the former Yugoslavia judges
Hungarian jurists
Hungarian judges
Members of the Permanent Court of Arbitration
Permanent Representatives of Hungary to the United Nations
Eötvös Loránd University alumni
Hungarian judges of United Nations courts and tribunals
Hungarian judges of international courts and tribunals